Douglas Mountain may refer to:

Douglas Mountain (Maine)
Douglas Mountain (Washington)
Douglas Mountain, written by Alexander Wilder and Arnold Sundgaard in 1965